Mohammad Shir (born 1942) is an Afghan former wrestler who competed at the 1988 Summer Olympic Games in the lightweight event.

References

Wrestlers at the 1988 Summer Olympics
Afghan male sport wrestlers
Olympic wrestlers of Afghanistan
1942 births
Living people